Olive Branch Missionary Baptist Church, also known as Olive Branch Baptist Church, is a historic Baptist church located at Moneta, Bedford County, Virginia, United States. The original section was built about 1896, and expanded about 1920. It is a one-story, "T"-shaped wood-frame building clad in weatherboard siding.  It features an original bell tower and Gothic Revival style lancet windows.  Adjacent to the church is a contributing cemetery.

It was listed on the National Register of Historic Places in 2007.

References

Baptist churches in Virginia
Churches in Bedford County, Virginia
Churches completed in 1896
Carpenter Gothic church buildings in Virginia
19th-century Baptist churches in the United States
Churches on the National Register of Historic Places in Virginia
National Register of Historic Places in Bedford County, Virginia
1896 establishments in Virginia